Trasona (in Asturian Tresona, and officially Trasona/Tresona is one of seven parishes (administrative divisions) in the Corvera de Asturias municipality, within the province and autonomous community of Asturias, in northern Spain. 

Its population is 2,103 (INE 2011).

Economy

The main economical activity in Trasona is the industry, with the plants of Aceralia and Fertiberia as the most importants in the municipality of Corvera. In the town is located Parque Astur, one of the most important commercial centres in Asturias. Trasona serves also as livestock zone.

Sports
In Trasona is located the Trasona reservoir which serves as a high performance centre, mainly for canoeing and rowing. It hosted the 2010 Canoe Sprint European Championships.

Villages

El Cuetu
Fafilán
Favila
Gabitos
Gudín
La Marzaniella
Mocín
Overo
El Palacio
El Pedrero / El Pedréu
Rovés
San Pelayo
Silvota
Tarín
Trasmonte / Tresmonte
Truyés
Les Cases del Gozón
El Pobladín

References

Parishes in Corvera de Asturias